The 2018–19 season is Klubi i Futbollit Tirana's 80th competitive season, 78th in the Kategoria Superiore and 98th year in existence as a football club.

Season overview

June
On 1 June 2018, Tirana announced to have signed a new two-year contract with manager Zé Maria, making him the highest paid coach in Albania.  The defender Erion Hoxhallari agreed a new contract until June 2020 despite interest from several European clubs. Then he was sent on loan at fellow Superliga side Laçi on a short-term contract only for their UEFA Europa League campaign.

On 14 June, Tirana reached a principal agreement with striker Michael Ngoo for the contract renewal. The club announced their first summer transfer nine days later, the Macedonian striker Dejan Blazhevski, who signed a 1+1 contract.

On 29 June, the youngster Ernest Muçi signed his first professional contract that will link him with Tirana for the next three years. The club also presented their second signing of summer transfer window, the midfielder Eni Imami who signed for the next two seasons.

July
Tirana begun the month by completing the signing of Vincent Atinga on a contract until June 2021. Youngsters Jurgen Çelhaka and Marsel Ismailgeci both signed three-year contracts, their firsts as professionals. The club then announced the next signing, the Ghanaian midfielder Winful Cobbinah, who signed a three-year deal.

The club did not offer a new deal the youngster Patrik Bardhi who left as a free agent and later signed for Kastrioti Krujë. After one season, Alked Çelhaka left the club by terminating the contract by mutual consent.

On 16 July, Asion Daja and Dorian Kërçiku both signed contracts for the new season. On 23 July, Tirana beat the concurrence of their rivals Partizani and signed the midfielder Edon Hasani on a two-year contract. The next days, Tirana announced that they were going to play friendly matches with Apolonia Fier, Flamurtari Pristina and Prishtina.

In the first friendly, Tirana recorded a 2–0 win at Selman Stërmasi Stadium against Apolonia Fier with the goal coming from newcomers Dejan Blazhevski and Edon Hasani. On 27 July, Sedat Berisha was unveiled as Tirana's newest player by signing a one-year contract with an option to renew. In the second one, Tirana won again, this time 3–0 versus Flamurtari Pristina.

August
Club vice-captain Gentian Muça returned in training after more than a year after healing from the Spinal disc herniation and a neck tumor which he discovered in July of the previous year. In the third and final friendly against Prishtina, Tirana suffered the first loss, as the Football Superleague of Kosovo side won 3–1 with Albi Doka scoring the consolation goal for the team.

On 14 August, Tirana acquired the services of goalkeeper Shpëtim Moçka as a free agent. Moçka, who previously played for Teuta Durrës, signed a contract running until the end of the 2018–19 season. Tirana commenced the Kategoria Superiore season four days later by playing against Kamza at home; the team surprisingly lost via a Sebino Plaku late winner. The following week, Tirana didn't go more than a goalless draw against Teuta Durrës, earning their first championship point.

Players such as Rei Qilimi, Alvaro Bishaj, Jurgen Vrapi, Hardy Binguila and Kenneth Muguna were all released by the club.

On 29 August, Tirana was drawn in the first round of the 2018–19 Albanian Cup against Iliria Fushë-Krujë.

On 31 August 2018, Nnamdi Oduamadi joined the club on a two-year contract.

September
Tirana begun the new month by playing in the third league match against Kukësi at Loro Boriçi Stadium; youngster Ernest Muçi scored the consolation goal for the team which was defeated 3–1. Two goals from Cobbinah and one each from Blazhevski and Turtulli secured a 4–1 victory in the first leg of the Albanian Cup, first round, over Iliria Fushë-Krujë.

Back in league, Tirana won their first championship match on 16 September by defeating Luftëtari Gjirokastër 3–1 at home; Blazhevski, Turtulli and Greca gave Tirana their first top-flight win after 484 days. The team then played Skënderbeu Korçë away in the matchday 5; despite opening the score with a header from Edon Hasani, the team conceded in the last minutes in a match which was marred by referee's mistakes.

On 25 September, Tirana won comfortably the second leg of Albanian Cup first round against Iliria Fushë-Krujë; Sentamu scored a hat-trick which was followed by Ngoo's goal. The team will play Flamurtari Vlorë in the second round.

Three days later, Tirana played their first derby match against Partizani Tirana after more than a year; the team lost again, making it 14 consecutive matches without winning. The loss also meant the team's worst Kategoria Superiore start since 2007–08 season.

October
Tirana's October begun with a 3–2 win at Kastrioti Krujë for the second win of the season. A brace by Blazhevski and an owngoal from Stijepović sealed the victory for the white&blues. It was Tirana's first away win in Kategoria Superiore since February 2016.

In the next league match, Tirana fell at the hands of Laçi; the guests won 1–0 at Selman Stërmasi Stadium thanks to a goal of Redon Xhixha while Blazhevski missed a crucial penalty in the last minutes. Following the match, striker Nnamdi Oduamadi was sent to hospital with a broken rib due to heavy challenges from Laçi players.

Players

Squad information

From youth squad

Transfers

Transfers in

Transfers out

Loans out

Pre-season and friendlies

Competitions

Kategoria Superiore

League table

Results summary

Results by round

Matches

Albanian Cup

First round

Second round

Quarter-finals

Semi-finals

Final

Statistics

Squad stats
{|class="wikitable" style="text-align: center;"
|-
!
! style="width:70px;"|League
! style="width:70px;"|Cup
! style="width:70px;"|Total Stats
|-
|align=left|Games played       ||24 || 5 || 29
|-
|align=left|Games won          ||7 || 4 || 12 
|-
|align=left|Games drawn        ||8 || 0 || 8 
|-
|align=left|Games lost         ||9 || 1 || 10 
|-
|align=left|Goals scored       ||28 || 13 || 41 
|-
|align=left|Goals conceded     ||25 || 2 || 27 
|-
|align=left|Goal difference    ||+3 ||+11 || +14
|-
|align=left|Clean sheets       ||6 || 3 || 9 
|-

Top scorers

Last updated: 3 October 2018

Clean sheets
The list is sorted by shirt number when total appearances are equal.

Last updated: 25 September 2018

References

External links
Official website

KF Tirana seasons
Tirana